Sypharochiton torri is a species of chiton in the family Chitonidae found in New Zealand.

References

Chitonidae
Molluscs described in 1907
Endemic fauna of New Zealand
Endemic molluscs of New Zealand